Barbadians or Bajans 
(pronounced  ) are people who are identified with the country of Barbados, by being citizens or their descendants in the Barbadian diaspora. The connection may be residential, legal, historical or cultural. For most Barbadians, several (or all) of those connections exist and are collectively the source of their identity. Barbadians are a multi-ethnic and multicultural society of various ethnic, religious and national origins; therefore Barbadians do not necessarily equate their ethnicity with their Barbadian nationality.

Ethnic groups
Most Barbadians are of African or mixed-race descent. They are descendants of enslaved people brought from West Africa. White Barbadians are mainly of British and Irish descent. There is also a small population of Syrians, Lebanese, Jewish, Indian and Chinese people in the country.

Diaspora
Many Barbadians now live overseas and outside of Barbados; the majority have migrated to Anglophone countries, including around 65,000 in the United States, 37,780 in Canada, some 19,000 in the United Kingdom, and some 500–1,000 Barbadians in Liberia. In addition to Anglophone countries other groups of Barbadians have moved to Latin countries including Brazil, Cuba and Panama.

List of notable Barbadians

See also
 Barbadian nationality law
 Demographics of Barbados
 Afro-Barbadians
 Barbadian Americans
 Barbadian Brazilians
 Barbadian British
 Barbadian Canadians
 Island Caribs

References